Theunis Piersma (born 15 June 1958) is a Dutch ornithologist, ecologist, and educator. He is among the most influential ornithologists, particularly in the wader bird area, in the world. He specifically looks at waders and correlations between flock size and distribution, climate, food, predators, pathogens, and their historical-genetic background. RTV Drenthe referred to him in 2012 as the "first migratory bird professor in the world."

He is currently a professor and chair of the Global Flyway Ecology department at the University of Groningen and Senior Research Leader at Royal Netherlands Institute of Sea Research (NIOZ). He is also a Wadden biologist at the Royal Netherlands Institute for Sea Research, where he works on sea conservation.

Education
Piersma earned his BSc in biology and palaeontology in 1980; his biology MSc cum laude in 1984; and his PhD cum laude in biology in 1994, all from the University of Groningen. Piersma led his first research trip to Mauritania in 1980 as a student. His PhD advisor was animal ecologist Rudolf H. Drent. Following graduation, he moved to the NIOZ as a postdoc.

Career

Research
Among his many contributions to the scientific community are proof that a bird's maximum non-stop flight distance was more than double what it was originally known to be;  examination of the phenotype and its relation to evolution; and the discovery that "migratory birds can change the structure of their bodies radically in order to adapt to the diverse conditions they encounter on their journeys." His research on the ecology of the Yellow Sea was a major influence in China refining environmental policy and increasing conservation efforts. Nature organizations in the Netherlands ended all mechanical cockle fishing in the Wadden Sea after his work at NIOZ proved it harmful. This was a particular achievement, as he has criticized the Netherlands for not working harder on conservation efforts.

As of 2020, Piersma has published more than 500 peer-reviewed articles and 14 books. Among his many funding sources, he received 2 NWO grants to research tools used for bird tracking in 2011, and 2 from National Geographic in 2014.

He is heavily involved in Wader's Study Groups and served as vice-chair of the International Wader Study Group for 15 years. He has also been the editor-in-chief of Ardea, a peer-reviewed ornithological journal, and helped found the Global Flyway Network to track birds nationwide. At University of Groningen, he was the animal ecology chair for 9 years before moving to the global flyway ecology department and serving as its chair. He appeared as the subject of De wereld is plat (The World is Flat), a 2007 Dutch documentary about his conservation work.

Work in Friesland
Piersma helped found start the Station Fryslân 2018, a citizens' ecological organization dedicated to looking after Freisland's environment. In 2012, the initiative established ‘Kening fan ’e Greide’ (King of the Meadow, a reference to the godwit), which enabled farmers, scientists, and artists to collaborate in an effort to "promote sustainable attitudes to nature and the landscape."

Outreach
Piersma is known for his creative teaching style, which he tries to make accessible to everyone. In 2012, he opened the  WWF's Dutch Jubilee Conference with a theatre performance illustrating the migration of the black-tailed godwit, with composer Sytze Pruiksma providing accompanying music. He has two main performances: The Sound and Science of Bird Migration and Music of Migration, which he has performed in front of Queen Beatrix of the Netherlands, at the Oerol Festival, and to the Bohai Bay community while he was there studying the Yellow Sea.

Personal life
Piersma was born in Hemelum in 1958; his native language is Frisian. He currently lives in Gaast.

Awards and honours
In 2001, a red knot subspecies from the New Siberian Islands was named Calidris canutus piersmai in his honour.

Books

References

External links

 Global Flyway Network tracking website
 Profile at University of Groningen

1958 births
Living people
Dutch biologists
Members of the Royal Netherlands Academy of Arts and Sciences
Spinoza Prize winners
Academic staff of the University of Groningen
People from Nijefurd
Dutch ornithologists
Frisian scientists
Dutch ecologists
Dutch conservationists
People from Friesland
University of Groningen alumni
Dutch people of Frisian descent
Recipients of the Order of the Netherlands Lion
Knights of the Order of the Netherlands Lion